Wu Wenxiong (born February 11, 1981) is a retired Chinese weightlifter who competed in the 56 kg class. He was fifth at the 1999 World Championships and won the silver medal at the 2000 Olympics in Sydney, Australia.

See also
China at the 2000 Summer Olympics

References
sports-reference

1981 births
Living people
Chinese male weightlifters
Olympic silver medalists for China
Olympic weightlifters of China
Weightlifters at the 2000 Summer Olympics
Olympic medalists in weightlifting
Weightlifters at the 2002 Asian Games
Medalists at the 2000 Summer Olympics
Asian Games competitors for China
21st-century Chinese people